Amy Gottlieb (born 1953) is a Canadian queer activist, artist and educator. She was one of the organizers of the first Pride Toronto (then called Lesbian and Gay Pride Day) in 1981.  She was also an organizer of the Dykes on the Street March, organized by Lesbians Against the Right, which occurred in October of the same year.

Biography 
Amy Gottlieb was born in 1953. Since the early 1970s, she has been involved in socialist and feminist activism. Her political involvement started with the peace movement and the civil rights movement. She met her first lesbian lover in 1973 and soon began to dedicate herself to queer causes as well. Since then, she has been an activist for numerous queer, Jewish, and artistic causes, including the Lesbian Organization of Toronto (LOOT), the Jewish Women's Committee to End the Occupation of the West Bank and Gaza, and MIX: the Magazine of Artist-Run Culture.

In 2017, she published an essay discussing her experiences as an organizer of Toronto's first lesbian march titled "Toronto’s Unrecognized First Dyke March" in Any Other Way: How Toronto Got Queer (Coach House Books). Gottlieb's portrait was painted for The ArQuives in 1998.

References

External links

1953 births
Activists from Toronto
Canadian lesbian writers
Jewish Canadian activists
Jewish Canadian artists
Canadian schoolteachers
Canadian LGBT rights activists
Living people
LGBT Jews
21st-century Canadian LGBT people
20th-century Canadian LGBT people